The 2021–22 National T20 Cup was a Twenty20 domestic cricket competition that was played in Pakistan. It was the eighteenth season of the National T20 Cup, with the tournament starting on 23 September 2021, and finished on 13 October 2021. In September 2021, the Pakistan Cricket Board (PCB) confirmed the fixtures for the tournament. Khyber Pakhtunkhwa were the defending champions.

Following the completion of the matches in Rawalpindi, Sindh, Khyber Pakhtunkhwa, Central Punjab and Northern had all won four of their six games, with Sindh topping the table on net run rate. Balochistan had won just two of their six matches, while Southern Punjab sat at the foot of the table with no wins from their six fixtures.

On 6 October 2021, four members of Balochistan's squad tested positive for COVID-19. As a result, their match scheduled for later the same day was moved back to 9 October 2021, with Northern and Southern Punjab playing each other instead.

Ahead of the penultimate day of group matches, Central Punjab, Khyber Pakhtunkhwa, Northern and Sindh had all qualified for the semi-finals of the tournament, with Balochistan and Southern Punjab being eliminated. In the first semi-final, Khyber Pakhtunkhwa beat Northern by five wickets, with Central Punjab beating Sindh by seven wickets in the second semi-final. Khyber Pakhtunkhwa won the final by seven wickets to win their second successive title. Khyber Pakhtunkhwa' Iftikhar Ahmed was named both the player of the final and the player of the tournament.

Squads
On 20 September 2021, the PCB confirmed all the squads for the tournament. Mohammad Hafeez missed the early matches of the National T20 Cup due to food poisoning, and with further tests he was diagnosed with dengue fever.

Points table

Fixtures

Round-robin

Finals

References

External links
 Series home at ESPN Cricinfo

2021 in Pakistani cricket
Domestic cricket competitions in 2021–22
2021-22 National T20 Cup
Pakistani cricket seasons from 2000–01